Maurice Fitzmaurice (23 May 1869 – 8 August 1954) was an Irish hurler who played for the Kerry senior team.

Fitzmaurice was a regular member of the starting twenty-one during Kerry's must successful hurling period shortly after the foundation of the Gaelic Athletic Association and the start of the inter-county championship. During his career he won one All-Ireland medal and one Munster medal.

At club level Fitzmaurice played with Lixnaw.

His great-grandson, Éamonn Fitzmaurice, was a three-time All-Ireland medalist with Kerry in Gaelic football.

References

1869 births
1954 deaths
Irish farmers
Kerry inter-county hurlers
Lixnaw hurlers
All-Ireland Senior Hurling Championship winners